Samuel Contesti (born 4 March 1983) is a French-Italian former competitive figure skater. He originally competed for France, then switched to Italy after the 2006–07 season. He is the 2009 European silver medalist and a five-time Italian national champion (2008–12).

Personal life 
Samuel Contesti's father, Yves, was a professional football player in Ligue 1. He has two older sisters. 

Contesti married Geraldine Zulini in February 2007 and their son, Ennio, was born in June 2009. Their second child was born in 2012.

Career 
Contesti initially competed for France, placing ninth at the 2005 European Championships and 26th at Worlds the same year. The next season, he placed 5th at Trophée Eric Bompard and 2nd at French Nationals but did not compete at Europeans or Worlds. In autumn 2006, Contesti was assigned to compete at Skate America, however, the French skating federation decided to withdraw his name. In 2007, he won bronze at French Nationals.

Having married an Italian, Contesti began competing for Italy in March 2008. In spring of 2008, he moved to Courmayeur, Italy. By capturing silver at the 2009 European Championships, Contesti became the first male single skater to win a medal for Italy at the event in 55 years, since Carlo Fassi's gold in 1954. At the 2009 World Championships, Contesti placed 5th, his career-best finish at the event.

Contesti confirmed his retirement from competition on 15 June 2012.

Programs

Competitive highlights 
GP: Grand Prix; JGP: Junior Grand Prix

For Italy

For France

References

External links 

 
 

French male single skaters
Italian male single skaters
1983 births
Living people
Figure skaters at the 2010 Winter Olympics
Olympic figure skaters of Italy
European Figure Skating Championships medalists
Sportspeople from Le Havre